Maenalus or Mainalos was a town of ancient Arcadia, and the capital of the district Maenalia (Μαιναλία), which formed part of the territory of Megalopolis upon the foundation of the latter city. Maenalus was in ruins in the time of Pausanias, who mentions a temple of Athena, a stadium, and a hippodrome, as belonging to the place. 

Its site is tentatively located near the modern Davia.

People
Nicodamus (sculptor)

References

Populated places in ancient Arcadia
Former populated places in Greece